The Vir-e-Hind (Warrior of India)  was a military decoration awarded by the Azad Hind Government. The award was a second class star below the award of Sardar-e-Jung. First instituted by Subhas Chandra Bose in Germany, it was later also awarded to troops of the Indian National Army in South East Asia. The award could be conferred with swords for valour in combat, and without swords for non-combat awards. At least one award was made, to Capt Shangara Singh Mann. Capt. Mann was also awarded the Sardar-e-Jung medal.

See also
Indian National Army
Indische Legion

External links
TracesOfWar.com
https://web.archive.org/web/20070716142416/http://www.diggerhistory.info/pages-medals/nazi6.htm
http://www.axishistory.com/index.php?id=1819

Military awards and decorations of Azad Hind